Quadrastichus is a genus of hymenopteran insects of the family Eulophidae.

Species include Quadrastichus erythrinae and Quadrastichus mendeli.

References

External links

Key to Nearctic eulophid genera
Universal Chalcidoidea Database

Eulophidae